General Harris may refer to:

United Kingdom
George Harris (physician) (1856–1931), British Indian Army major general
George Harris, 1st Baron Harris (1746–1829), British Army lieutenant general
Ian Harris (British Army officer) (1910–1999), British Army lieutenant general
William Harris, 2nd Baron Harris (1782–1845), British Army lieutenant general

United States
David Harris (Illinois politician) (born 1948), Illinois National Guard Adjutant General
David A. Harris Jr. (fl. 1990s–2020s), U.S. Air Force major general
Edgar S. Harris Jr. (1925–2018), U.S. Air Force lieutenant general
Field Harris (1895–1967), U.S. Marine Corps lieutenant general
Harold D. Harris (1903–1984), U.S. Marine Corps brigadier general
Harold R. Harris (1895–1988), U.S. Army Air Force brigadier general
Hugh P. Harris (1909–1979), U.S. Army four-star general
Hunter Harris Jr. (1909–1987), U.S. Air Force four-star general
Jeptha Vining Harris (Mississippi general) (1816–1899), Mississippi Militia brigadier general in the American Civil War
Jerry D. Harris (1980s–2010s), U.S. Air Force lieutenant general
Marcelite J. Harris (1943–2018), U.S. Air Force major general
Nathaniel H. Harris (1834–1900), Confederate States Army brigadier general
Peter Charles Harris (1865–1951), U.S. Army major general
Stayce Harris (born 1959), U.S. Air Force lieutenant general
Thomas Alexander Harris (1826–1895), Missouri State Guard (Confederate) brigadier general 
Thomas Maley Harris (1817–1906), Union Army brigadier general and brevet major general
Walter Alexander Harris (1875–1958), U.S. Army major general
William Harris (colonist) (1757–1812), Pennsylvania Militia brigadier general

See also
Attorney General Harris (disambiguation)